Desire is an American telenovela which debuted at 8:00PM Eastern/7:00PM Central on September 5, 2006, on the American network MyNetworkTV, and ended on December 5. It was produced by Twentieth Television.

The program starred Sofia Milos, Michelle Belegrin, Nate Haden, Kelly Albanese, Zack Silva, Chuti Tiu, Jessie Ward, Tanisha Harper, Will Rolland, Al Bandiero, Kristen Kerr, and Eliana Alexander.  Haden and Silva played two brothers on the run from the Gamarras, a New Jersey crime family. They run from Bayonne to Los Angeles and become restaurateurs.  Along the way, the pair find themselves on a heated trail of passion, betrayal, and murder over the woman they both loved (played by Belegrin).

The Desire brand is also used as an umbrella name for Twentieth's limited-run serials.

As of 2021, the entire series can be seen on TubiTV.

Origins
The show first emerged in late 2005 as a September syndicated program for the stations on the FOX network to air in a weekend or midday time period. The idea was greenlit by Fox Television Stations Chairman Roger Ailes as a contingency plan for Fox-owned UPN stations.  After receiving lukewarm response from stations not owned and operated by Fox, Twentieth Television decided to pitch the show for June 2006 on the premise that teenagers are out of school and planted in front of their TV sets, and that reruns dominate network schedules.

Desire had a few takers for a planned summer syndication run.  Twentieth made those stations  surrender the show, thanks to a clause in its contract that allows Fox to take away the show if it is carried by a network.  It was also briefly considered for placement on The CW Television Network, but was taken off the table by Fox for use on MyNetworkTV.

Desire is based on the 2004 Colombian television program Mesa Para Tres (Table for Three), which aired on Caracol TV.  Changes have been made in the location and the plot to make them more palatable to Americans.  The serial was known as Table for Three and Three's a Crowd before its debut.  The show was filmed at Stu Segall Productions in San Diego, using 25 principal actors, 250 supporting actors and about 2,000 extras.

Cast

Episodes

The Desire Brand
The original format of the Desire syndicated program was for three telenovelas to run with different titles. The Desire name was intended as an umbrella for all the separate telenovelas within. When MyNetworkTV picked up the telenovelas, Desire was used as the name of one series.

The network later revived the Desire name as an umbrella title.  MyNetworkTV promoted Wicked Wicked Games and American Heiress as "part of the Desire series."

Performance
Ratings for Desire fell below expectations.  The debut scored a 2.0 rating and the first week averaged an 0.8 rating and 1 share.  It averaged a 0.4 rating in the adult 18–49 demographic., falling to a 0.3 in its second week.

The program has also been sold to several international markets, however. In Asia, for example, Star World debuted the show on November 7, 2006, and in the United Kingdom Trouble has picked up the rights to show the series.

Theme
The theme song is sung by Sheryl Crow and is called "Always on Your Side". It was released on her Wildflower CD. We 3 Kings also performed music in various episodes. The U.K. Based trio  All Mighty Whispers also have their song "Heaven have me now" included in an episode of the series.

Profanity
The Parents Television Council filed a complaint with the Federal Communications Commission, saying that the word "shit" was used in scripted dialogue during the September 21st broadcast.  The group also said the show was rated "TV-14," without the "L" descriptor that notes strong language.  It argued that MyNetworkTV was "deliberately breaking the indecency law" and deserves "stiff fines."

International sales

See also
 MyNetworkTV telenovelas

References

 Telenovela ready to heat up U. S. TV (Milwaukee Journal Sentinel)
 Ailes was prepared for UPN's demise (The Hollywood Reporter)

External links
 

MyNetworkTV original programming
2006 American television series debuts
2006 American television series endings
Television series by 20th Century Fox Television
2006 telenovelas
American telenovelas
American television series based on telenovelas
Television series about organized crime
Television series about brothers